Misery may refer to:

Fiction
 Misery (novel), by Stephen King
 Misery (film), based on the novel
 Misery (play), based on the novel
 "Misery" (short story), by Anton Chekhov
 "Misery" (New Girl), a television episode
 Misery, a character in the 2004 video game Cave Story
 Misery, a character in the television series Ruby Gloom

Music
 Misery (band), an Australian death metal band
 Misery, a member of the English metal band Mistress

Albums
 Misery (album) or the title song, by the Amity Affliction, 2018
 Misery (EP) or the title song, by Fuck the Facts, 2011
 Misery, by Disentomb, 2014

Songs
 "Misery" (Beatles song), 1963
 "Misery" (Creeper song), 2017
 "Misery" (Gwen Stefani song), 2016 album
 "Misery" (hide song), 1996
 "Misery" (Maroon 5 song), 2010
 "Misery" (Soul Asylum song), 1995
 "Misery", by the Autumn Offering from Embrace the Gutter, 2006
 "Misery", by BoDeans from Love & Hope & Sex & Dreams, 1986
 "Misery", by the Dynamics, 1963
 "Misery", by Earshot from Letting Go, 2002
 "Misery", by Gallows from Grey Britain, 2009
 "Misery", by Good Charlotte from Good Morning Revival, 2007
 "Misery", by Green Day from Warning, 2000
 "Misery", by HAM from Buffalo Virgin, 1989
 "Misery", by Hanson from Underneath, 2004
 "Misery", by Jonathan Kelly's Outside from ...Waiting on You, 1974
 "Misery", by the Kinks from Low Budget, 1979
 "Misery", by the Maine from Pioneer, 2011
 "Misery", by the Moffatts from Chapter I: A New Beginning, 1998
 "Misery", by Pink from Missundaztood, 2001
 "Misery", by Spleen United from School of Euphoria, 2012
 "Misery", by Therapy? from Infernal Love, 1995

Places
 Misery, Somme, commune in France
 Misery, a village in the municipality of Misery-Courtion

See also
 Mount Misery (disambiguation)
 Misery Index (disambiguation)
 Sweet Misery (disambiguation)
 Miser (disambiguation)
 Missouri (disambiguation)